Montreux Two is a live album by jazz saxophonist Archie Shepp recorded at the Montreux Jazz Festival in 1975 and released on the Arista Freedom label.

Reception 
The Allmusic review by Scott Yanow states: "Tenor saxophonist Archie Shepp was at a turning point of sorts in 1975. He was near the end of his free jazz phase and would soon be exploring melodies from both the jazz tradition and the early 20th century; in addition, his tone would begin to decline within a decade. However, that is not in evidence during this fairly rousing live appearance at the Montreux Jazz Festival with his quintet.... This second of two CDs is the better of the pair and a good outing for Archie Shepp."

Track listing 
All compositions by Archie Shepp
 "Steam"
 "Along Came Betty"
 "Blues For Donald Duck"
 Recorded at the Montreux Jazz Festival, Switzerland, July 18, 1975.

Personnel 
 Archie Shepp - tenor saxophone
 Charles Greenlee - trombone
 Dave Burrell - piano
 Cameron Brown - bass
 Beaver Harris - drums

References 

1976 live albums
Archie Shepp live albums
Freedom Records live albums
albums produced by Michael Cuscuna
albums recorded at the Montreux Jazz Festival